"Tor Premete" also known songs first stanza as "Tor Premete Ondho Holam" is a National Award-winning song from the 2017 Bangladeshi romantic-drama film Swatta sung by James. The song composed by Bappa Mazumder and choreographed by Masum Babul. The lyrics of the song written by Sohani Hossain, the producer and story writer of the film, and Shakib Khan and Paoli Dam performed in the song. The song was released on Deco's YouTube channel under the banner of Qinetic Network on March 30, 2017.

For the song Sohani Hossain won the Global Music Awards for Best Lyricist in 2018, and James won the National Film Awards, the Meril Prothom Alo Awards and the Bachsas Awards in the Best Male Singer category. The song placed number 1 in the List of the Top 50 songs by ABC Radio in 2017, and it was ranked number 3 on the "Top 10 Bengali Songs Listened to YouTube in 2017" by The Daily Star.

Background 
The song is sung James and composed by Bappa Mazumder. James recorded the song on August 3, 2014, under the banner of Qinetic Network.

Song credits 
The song credits mentioned in the official music video's description of the song Tor Premete on YouTube are,

Release and response 
The song was released on Deco's YouTube channel under the banner of Qinetic Network on March 30, 2017.  the song has been viewed more than 10 million.

Accolades 
 The song placed number 1 in the List of the Top 50 songs by ABC Radio in 2017.
 The song was ranked number 3 on the "Top 10 Bengali Songs Listened to YouTube in 2017" by The Daily Star.

The song received several awards in the category of best lyricist, music director and singer. The list is given below:

References

External links 
 

2017 songs
Bangladeshi film songs
Bengali-language songs
Songs written for films
Bengali film songs
Best Male Playback Singer National Film Award (Bangladesh)-winning songs
James (musician) songs